Ash Shanin (الشنين ) is a village of Basrah Governorate in southern Iraq located on the south bank of the Euphrates River opposite the confluence with the Tigris River.

Geography
It is on the west side of the Shatt Al-Arab River and linked with Al Qurnah by a road bridge.
The topography is flat, the elevation is 4m above sea level and the climate arid.

History
During the First World War the battle of Qurnah was fought in this area.
The area suffered greatly during the Iran–Iraq War, during which it was a major battlefield, and again after the 1991 Iraqi uprising.

References

Populated places in Basra Province